Oswold Counsell Stephens (11 December 1896 – 8 May 1980) was a notable New Zealand teacher, chemist and potter. He was born in Dunedin, New Zealand in 1896. He was elected a life member of the New Zealand Society of Potters in 1965, together with Elizabeth Matheson and Olive Jones.

References

1896 births
1980 deaths
New Zealand potters
Schoolteachers from Dunedin
New Zealand chemists
Scientists from Dunedin
20th-century ceramists